The Loss of the Kink Salient occurred during a local attack on 11 May 1916, by the 3rd Bavarian Division on the positions of the 15th (Scottish) Division. The attack took place at the west end of the  Redoubt near Loos, on the Western Front during the First World War. An unprecedented bombardment demolished the British front line, then specially trained German assault units rushed the survivors and captured the British front line and the second line of defence; British tunnellers were trapped in their galleries and taken prisoner.

Hasty counter-attacks by the British were repulsed amidst the darkness, smoke and dust, which left British artillery observers unable to see the front line. The counter-attack made progress at Hussar Horn in the early hours of 12 May but was abandoned. A final attempt to recapture the lost ground on 14 May was defeated and the British consolidated a new line further back, on ground less exposed than the Kink.

Background

1915

The Battle of Loos took place in support of the French autumn offensive by the Tenth Army, which fought the Third Battle of Artois  and the Second and Fourth armies in the Second Battle of Champagne . The British attack began on 25 September, when the infantry advanced behind a cloud gas discharge, intended to make up for a lack of artillery and ammunition.

British attacks to regain  began on 28 September but the  Redoubt was also lost on 3 October. The British front was reorganised for another attempt, which due to delays and bad weather, was forestalled by a German surprise attack on 8 October, from Loos to La Bassée Canal. The delayed British attack went ahead on 13 October, in the action of the Hohenzollern Redoubt, during which the 46th (North Midland) Division overran the redoubt. The British were forced to retire after dark, because their salient was untenable. The British retreated to The Chord, a trench behind the east face of the redoubt and the west face was fortified as a reserve line. The attack had been a costly failure, in which the 46th (North Midland) Division suffered  most in the first ten minutes of the attack.

1916

After the Battle of the Hohenzollern Redoubt in 1915, the British had retained the west end of the redoubt, with The Chord as the new front line. Artillery bombardments and tunnelling were conducted by the Germans during the winter of 1915–1916; due to the nature of the clay covering and chalk below ground, mine explosions threw up high lips around mine craters, which made good observation points. Observation increased the accuracy of German bombardments and The Chord was re-captured, leaving the British on lower ground in the west side of the redoubt. The British 170th Tunnelling Company, dug deep galleries over four months during the winter and in late February, three mines were placed underneath the shallower galleries dug by the Germans. An attack was prepared by the 12th (Eastern) Division for 2 March, to recapture The Chord.

The new craters, A, B and C, older craters 1 to 5 and Triangle Crater were occupied and the 170th Tunnelling Company destroyed German mine entrances found in the Triangle Crater. German counter-attacks retook Triangle Crater on 4 March and from 7 to 14 March, skirmishing took place during heavy snowstorms and bitter cold. German attacks diminished until 18 March, when five mines were blown, the captured portions of The Chord were re-taken and the British were driven back to the old front line. The Germans found the area equally untenable and retired to the eastern side of the crater lips. The British had found the craters to be poor protection against bombardment and the morass of liquefied chalk and mud at the crater bottoms was not suitable material for protection. Revetments dug into the crater lips was soon blown up by German shells or slipped down the crater sides.

The Kink

After the fighting in March 1916, the British front line near  had become a blunt salient known as the Kink, between the  Redoubt and the Cité St. Elie quarries. The area was regularly bombarded with great accuracy by German artillery and trench mortars. Many British troops considered that the area was the worst place on the Western Front. The 170th Tunnelling Company RE had eventually managed to gain dominance over the German miners and by the end of April all of the craters except for one just north of the Kink had been re-captured. As a precaution, the old front line was maintained and further back, Hussar Horn and Anchor trenches crossed, making switch lines. A reserve line ran along Hulluch Alley and Sackville Street  further back and the Village Line lay another  beyond.

Prelude

German preparations and plan

Bavarian Infantry Regiment 18 of the 3rd Bavarian Division, took over the area from the quarries to the  Redoubt on 1 April and found that the ground opposite the Kink was a narrow crater field, with no view of the British lines. The British held all but one crater, could creep up on the German lines and begin new mine galleries from the craters. As the situation in the area deteriorated, the 3rd Bavarian Division planned to eliminate the threat by a surprise attack.

Quick entry and exit from the dugouts was rehearsed and each soldier was shown the gap in the German barbed wire which he was to pass through. The attack was to begin at  led by bombing parties and bayonet men identified by black armlets, carrying wire cutters, spades and ladders. The second wave wearing white armbands were to carry entrenching tools and a third wave in red armlets, were to follow with knife rests, dugout frames, steel plates and planks. Each Non-commissioned officer was to wear a white board with the company number in black to keep units together. Ten minutes before zero hour, the troops moved into the front line.

British defensive preparations

The 15th (Scottish) Division took over the line around the Kink on 27 April, a day when German artillery and trench mortar fire increased. On 1 May, the Germans blew a small mine at Hussar Horn and a second mine on 5 May, which did no damage and was taken by the British to be for improvements to the German defences. German machine-gun fire had increased at night, when the British were trying to consolidate the craters in no man's land, which led to the British firing a bombardment on the German trenches on 6 May. After the British retaliatory bombardment, the Germans returned to the normal amount of artillery-fire. By 11 May, the 15th (Scottish) Division front was held by the 46th Brigade on the right with the 8th King's Own Scottish Borderers (8th KOSB) and the 10th Scottish Rifles. On the left, the 45th Brigade held a sector with the 13th Royal Scots and the 11th Argyll and Sutherland Highlanders. The remaining four battalions of the brigades were in reserve and the 44th Brigade was accommodated in billets  behind the front line.

Battle

11 May
At  German artillery began to fire on the front of the 15th (Scottish) Division (Major-General Frederick McCracken) and at  the shelling fell on the Kink, from Border Redoubt to Clifford Street, in the area of the 13th Royal Scots of the 45th Brigade. The British artillery returned fire soon after but dust and smoke obscured the front and made observation impossible. McCracken ordered the reserve brigade to readiness, moved a battalion to Noyelles and manned machine-guns in the Village Line. At  the Germans sprung a mine near  Redoubt and then the German artillery-fire on the Kink diminished and increased at the redoubt. British artillery also switched targets and a German infantry attack was repulsed by the artillery and the small-arms fire of the 11th Argyll and Sutherland Highlanders (11th Argylls).

Villages and artillery positions behind the front line were bombarded with high explosive and gas shells. The 13th Royal Scots in the first line had been killed, casualties had reduced the rest of the battalion by half and the ground had become a field of shell-holes. At  German infantry moved forward, screened by the craters in no man's land and overwhelmed the survivors in the front line, after a short exchange of fire. The attackers then occupied Anchor Trench just behind, as the surviving  in the trench retreated to Sackville Street.

The German attackers overshot because the British trenches were unrecognisable and almost reached the British third line in the gloom. The troops were rallied and returned to the objective at the British second line. The 12th Royal Scots reserve company bombed forward from Sackville Street but were repulsed. During the night, the British artillery continued to fire at the wrong target and the German infantry were able to consolidate the captured ground undisturbed. At  the commander of the 6th/7th Royal Scots Fusiliers (6th/7th RSF) the 45th Brigade reserve battalion, took over in the sector.

Organised counter-attacks by bombing parties from the 6th/7th RSF began and other groups from the 46th Brigade area to the right joined in. The attacks failed against German machine-gun fire and Brigadier-General Allgood, commander of the 45th Brigade, ended the attempts to bomb along trenches. Most of the attackers were mown down by machine-gun fire but some reached the west end of Hussar Horn. At  on 12 May, the attempts were abandoned and a new front line was established in Sackville Street, which was consolidated with help from the 73rd Field company RE and the divisional pioneer battalion.

12–14 May
From  a huge volume of German artillery-fire continued to fall in the area of the Kink, which destroyed many trenches and buried men. The British bombardment was feeble and within ten minutes, German artillery replied with a counter-barrage. The left two platoons were to move into the support trench and at  both parties were to assemble along , ready to attack at  when the field artillery bombardment lifted to trenches behind .

A Company was to follow C Company and turn off by half-companies, into the support trench and the fire trench respectively. When A Company got into the fire trench, direction was lost and the right half of the support company turned up a blind sap, due to the bombardments of both sides altering the landscape, some trenches having been obliterated. The leading company had spent ninety minutes under German artillery and trench mortar bombardment and moved as fast as possible to clear the area. C Company reached  but forced out by German artillery and trench mortar fire.

A Company, which had also been bombarded all day, was withdrawn from the front line to the assembly point in darkness and over ground, because the ground to the front rose towards the German front line in Crown Trench. It took until midnight before B Company was ready; the attack was cancelled and the troops were ordered to consolidate the position before dawn.

Aftermath

Analysis

Misdirected British artillery-fire, which remained on the German front line all night, left the attackers to consolidate their gains undisturbed. British infantry were said to have recovered quickly from the surprise and counter-attacked using hand grenades all night. The counter-attack on 14 May, was described by the British official historian, James Edmonds, as breaking down under German machine-gun fire.

Casualties
The 170th Tunnelling Company RE lost  The II Battalion, Infantry Regiment 18 had  most lost on 12 May. Casualties in I Battalion, Infantry Regiment 23 are not known.

Notes

Footnotes

References

Further reading

External links

 Tunnelling Companies RE

World War I sites in France
Tunnel warfare in World War I
Explosions in 1916
Conflicts in 1916
1916 in France
Battles of the Western Front (World War I)
Battles of World War I involving France
Battles of World War I involving Germany
Battles of World War I involving the United Kingdom
May 1916 events